Hungarian forint coins are part of the physical form of current Hungarian currency, the Hungarian forint. Modern forint coins (this name is used to distinguish them from pre-20th century forint coinage) have been struck since 1946 and reflect the changes of post-World War II Hungarian history.

2nd Republic issues (1946–1948)
After the trauma of the Second World War and the hyperinflation of the pengő the Hungarian government had to face the problems of introducing a new currency. In the case of coins this meant that they had to express stability and raise confidence in the people toward the new money. The first coins minted in 1946 were made of copper alloys in the case of the fillér coins and aluminium in the case of the 1 & 2 forint coins. Although the forint was based on gold standard, only silver coins were minted in the first 2 years: 5 forint coins made of good quality silver were put into circulation. However, the government fear of hoarding these coins convinced the national bank to lower the mass and quality of silver used for the 1947 strike. Finally, no silver 5 forint coins were minted for general circulation after 1947. The 5 & 50 fillér coins were first minted in 1948 and were made of aluminium.

Commemorative coins appeared early, the first being a series of 3 coins in 1948 to commemorate the centennial of the 1848 revolution.

People's Republic issues (1949–1989)
In 1949 the communist party took power in every field of politics and economy. The country's name was changed to Hungarian People's Republic (Magyar Népköztársaság) which replaced the former name on the coins. The Kossuth's coat of arms was replaced with the Rákosi's one (see: coat of arms of Hungary). The 2, 10 and 20 fillér coins were made of aluminium after 1950.

As a consequence of the Hungarian Revolution of 1956 the coat of arms was changed again, this version was used from 1957 until 1989.

3rd Republic issues (1989–2011)
In 1992, a new series of coins was introduced in denominations of 1, 2, 5, 10, 20, 50 and 100 forint . Production of 2 and 5 fillér coins ceased in 1992, with all fillér coins withdrawn from circulation by 1999. From 1996, a bimetallic 100 Forint coin was minted to replace the 1992 version, since the latter was considered to be "too big and ugly" by many, and could be easily mistaken with the 20 forint coin. The 200 forint coin was made of .500 fine silver. From 1994, mass minting of the 200 forint coin was stopped, since the price of the metal was getting higher than the face value of the coin. However, small issues for collector purposes were minted until 1998, when both the 1992 type 100 forint and the 200 forint coins were withdrawn from circulation.

The 1 and 2 Forint coins were withdrawn from circulation on March 1, 2008. This was announced by the Hungarian National Bank in September 2007, pointing out that the cost of minting them is too high, approximately 4 times their face value. When paying with cash, the total is to be rounded to 5 forint.   The 200 forint notes have been replaced with a new 200 forint coin in 2009.  The Chain Bridge was chosen in an internet poll between October 13 and  October 26, 2008 to be on the coin. The coin entered circulation on 15 June 2009.

Reportedly, the 1 forint coin was illegally exported to Canada in significant amounts, as the tiny coin could be used in place of genuine tokens for entry at the underground railway's automatic gates. This was a highly profitable venture that lasted until the machines were reprogrammed.  The 50 forint coin is confused with the UK 50 pence coin by some vending machines in the UK.

"Hungary" issues (2012–present)
According to Hungary's new constitution, effective as of 1 January 2012, the country's official name changes from "Magyar Köztársaság" (Hungarian Republic) to "Magyarország" (Hungary). Although Hungary is still a republic, this does not appear anymore on its coinage: from 2012 Hungarian legal tender will bear the country's new official name, "Magyarország". Previously struck coins remained legal tender and in circulation.

5-, 10-, and 20 forint coins are expected to appear in everyday circulation in 2012, with the rest of denominations following later, fulfilling the needs of Hungary's cash circulation. The official 2012 boxed set became available for collectors on 6 January 2012.

Remarks
 "MAGYAR ÁLLAMI VÁLTÓPÉNZ" = "Hungarian state token coin" - váltópénz literally means "small change"; here it stands to express that the metal of which the coin is made is worth less than the face value of the coin itself
 "MAGYAR KÖZTÁRSASÁG" = "Hungarian Republic"
 "MUNKA A NEMZETI JÓLÉT ALAPJA" = "Labour is the ground of national welfare"
 "M Á P V" = "Magyar Állami Pénzverde" = "Hungarian State Mint"
 "ESKÜSZÜNK ESKÜSZÜNK" = "We vow, we vow" (from the refrain of the Nemzeti dal by Sándor Petőfi)
 "A LEGNAGYOBB MAGYAR EMLÉKÉRE" = "To commemorate the greatest Hungarian" (Lajos Kossuth designated  István Széchenyi as such)
 "MAGYAR NÉPKÖZTÁRSASÁG" = "Hungarian People's Republic"

References

Further reading

 

forint
Hungarian forint